Slobodan Martinović (25 July 1945 – 10 January 2015) was a Serbian chess Grandmaster. He began in 1963, and played until his death.

Statistics

Martinović played 269 master games that were tracked by FIDE. Of them, 83 (31%) he won, 157 (58%) were draws, and 29 (11%) he lost.

Ranking
Martinović's FIDE rating was 2447. He ranked 41 among the active players of Serbia, and 1345 among the active players of the whole world. His best rating was 2480, in October 2008.

Games
Martinović played 264 master games that were recorded by FIDE.

Karpov
In 1985, Martinović drew with Anatoli Karpov in Amsterdam, using the Sicilian Defence, Scheveningen Variation. The game was 72 moves long.

See also
 List of chess grandmasters
 List of chess players

References

2015 deaths
Serbian chess players
1945 births
Chess grandmasters